Thomas Deenihan KC*HS (born 20 June 1967) is an Irish Roman Catholic prelate who has served as Bishop of Meath since 2018.

Early life and education

Deenihan was born in Blackpool, Cork on 20 June 1967. He attended secondary school at the North Monastery Christian Brothers School and studied for the priesthood at St Patrick’s College, Maynooth.

Deenihan was ordained a priest for the Diocese of Cork and Ross in 1991.

Presbyteral ministry 
Following ordination, Deenihan's first pastoral assignment was as curate in Glanmire. He was appointed to the teaching staff of St Goban's College, Bantry in 1994, during which time he also served as curate in Ballydehob, Bantry, Kealkill and Schull. As part of the Christian Leadership in Education Office programme, Deenihan also completed further studies at the University of Hull, completing a Master of Education in 1999 and subsequently a Doctor of Education.

He was appointed diocesan advisor for post-primary catechetics in 2003, and subsequently as diocesan secretary and education secretary three years later.

On a national level, Deenihan served as general secretary of the Catholic Primary Schools Management Association from 2013 to 2016, and acted as executive secretary to the Council for Education and the Commission for Catholic Education and Formation of the Irish Catholic Bishops' Conference from 2016 to 2018. He also served as a member of the Honan Governors at University College Cork and Mercy Care South, as diocesan juridical person for Mercy University Hospital and as chair of the Board of Directors of the Christian Leadership in Education Office.

Deenihan was appointed a canon and member of the cathedral chapter in 2017.

Episcopal ministry
Deenihan was appointed Bishop-elect of Meath by Pope Francis on 18 June 2018.

He was consecrated by the Archbishop of Armagh and Primate of All-Ireland, Eamon Martin, on 2 September at the Cathedral of Christ the King, Mullingar.

Speaking at the funeral of Ashling Murphy on 18 January 2022, Deenihan referred to her murder as "a depraved act of violence" and called on people to respect each other.

References

External links

Bishop Thomas Deenihan on Catholic-Hierarchy.org

 Bishop Thomas Deenihan on GCatholic

People from County Cork
1967 births
Living people
Roman Catholic bishops of Meath
21st-century Roman Catholic bishops in Ireland
Alumni of St Patrick's College, Maynooth
Alumni of the University of Hull